Shameless is the first full-length comedy special performed by comedian Louis C.K. It premiered on HBO January 13, 2007. The special was filmed in Los Angeles, California at the Henry Fonda Theater on November 4, 2006.

The DVD of the special was released on June 26, 2007 and C.K. re-released the audio-only version of the album on his website for download in 2020.

Track listing

Critical reception 

The Guardian website said "Fifteen years of hard work and evolution have created an apparently effortless honesty that is fluent and heartfelt. Louis CK is the voice of resignation."

The special holds a 96% on Rotten Tomatoes, based on user ratings.

References 

2007 live albums
2007 video albums
2000s comedy albums
2000s in comedy
Louis C.K. albums
Stand-up comedy concert films
2000s English-language films